Leonard C. Fons (October 30, 1903May 25, 1956) was an American lawyer and Republican politician.  He was a member of the Wisconsin State Senate from 1931 to 1935 representing southern Milwaukee County.

Biography
Fons was born on October 30, 1903, in Milwaukee, Wisconsin. His father, Louis Fons, was also a member of the Senate, having represented the 8th District. Fons went to Marquette University High School and Campion High School in Prairie du Chien, Wisconsin. He then graduated from Marquette University and received his law degree from Georgetown University Law Center. Fons practiced law in Milwaukee. He died in Milwaukee, Wisconsin on May 25, 1956, of a stroke.

Career
Fons was a member of the Senate from 1931 to 1934 as a Republican. In 1940, he was a candidate for the United States House of Representatives from Wisconsin's 4th congressional district as a member of the Wisconsin Progressive Party, losing to Thaddeus Wasielewski.

Electoral history

Wisconsin Senate (1930)

| colspan="6" style="text-align:center;background-color: #e9e9e9;"| General Election, November 4, 1930

Wisconsin Circuit Court (1940)

| colspan="6" style="text-align:center;background-color: #e9e9e9;"| General Election, April 5, 1940

U.S. House (1940)

| colspan="6" style="text-align:center;background-color: #e9e9e9;"| General Election, November 5, 1940

References

External links
The Political Graveyard

1903 births
1956 deaths
Politicians from Milwaukee
Republican Party Wisconsin state senators
Wisconsin Progressives (1924)
Marquette University alumni
Georgetown University Law Center alumni
Wisconsin lawyers
20th-century American politicians
Lawyers from Milwaukee
20th-century American lawyers